"Mine for Me" is a song written by Paul and Linda McCartney. It was recorded by Rod Stewart as a track for his 1974 album Smiler. When released as a single that year, the track became a minor hit in the United States, reaching number 91 on the Billboard Hot 100.

Cash Box said that "the song is a sensitive tune and Rod’s interpretation is excellent" and that "the instrumentation is mellow and Rod’s vocal textures do much to bring life to this vibrant tune." Record World said that the song "breezes along
with tropical climes suggested by steel drums."

References

1974 singles
Rod Stewart songs
Songs written by Paul McCartney
Songs written by Linda McCartney
1974 songs
Mercury Records singles